Falling Awake is the second studio album by Canadian indie-rock band Goodnight, Sunrise, released worldwide on September 30, 2016.

Like the band's debut album Create/Destroy/Create, Falling Awake is a concept album.  It describes a journey of self-exploration that moves through songs of uncertainty, fear, and chaos, towards self-knowledge.  The album release was preceded by the first single "Familiar Faces" on July 6, 2016.

Track listing

Personnel 
 David Kochberg - lead vocals, guitar, engineering, production
 Vanessa Vakharia - lead vocals, keyboards
 Paul Weaver - drums
 Pedro Salles - bass, backing vocals
 Matt Weston - mixing, engineering, alto sax on track 7
 Dean Marino - guitar engineering
 Isaac Moore - trumpet on track 7
 João Carvalho - mastering
 Genevieve Blais - album art photography

References

2016 albums
Goodnight, Sunrise albums
Concept albums